The International Paralympic Committee (IPC) is an international non-profit organisation and the global governing body for the Paralympic Movement. The IPC organizes the Paralympic Games and functions as the international federation for nine sports. Founded on 22 September 1989 in Düsseldorf, West Germany, its mission is to "enable Paralympic athletes to achieve sporting excellence and inspire and excite the world". Furthermore, the IPC wants to promote the Paralympic values and to create sport opportunities for all persons with a disability, from beginner to elite level.

The IPC has a democratic constitution and structure and is composed of representatives from 182 National Paralympic Committees (NPCs), four international organizations of sport for the disabled (IOSDs) and five regional organizations. The IPC's headquarters is located in Bonn, Germany.

Overview
On the basis of being able to organize the Paralympic Games more efficiently and to give the Paralympic movement one voice, the four international organizations of sports for the disabled, founded the International Co-ordination Committee of World Sports Organizations for the Disabled (ICC) in 1982. In the upcoming years, other organizations joined and the need for a democratically guided organization emerged, demanded by the nations participating in the Paralympic Movement. They desired a democratic structure, to improve national and regional representation, which led to the foundation of the IPC as it is known today. The 1994 Winter Paralympics, Norway, were the first to be organized by the IPC.

The IPC functions as an umbrella organization, representing several sports and disabilities, in contrast to other international sports organizations for athletes with a disability, which are predominantly limited to a single sport or disability (as well as the International Olympic Committee, who relies on separate member sanctioning bodies representing each Olympic sport).

A fifteen-member Governing Board oversees the IPC between meetings of the General Assembly. Dr. Robert D. Steadward became the first President in 1989. Since 2017, Andrew Parsons is President of the IPC.

Presidents

The International Paralympic Committee has had three presidents to date. Its founding president, who presided it from 1989 to 2001, was the Canadian Robert Steadward, who had previously founded the Canadian Sports Fund for the Physically Disabled. He was succeeded in 2001 by Philip Craven, a British Paralympian and former President of the International Wheelchair Basketball Federation, who served as president until 2017. Craven was succeeded by Brazil's Andrew Parsons, IPC Vice President from 2013 to 2017 and a former President of the Brazilian Paralympic Committee.

Governing Board 

The IPC Governing Board consists of 14 members, of which 12 are elected at the General Assembly, including the President and Vice President.  The most recent election for the Governing Board was held on 12 December 2021:
 Andrew Parsons, President
 Duane Kale, Vice President
 Debra Alexander
 Mohamed Alhameli
 Jai-Jun Choung
 Marianna "Muffy" Davis
 Chelsey Gotell
 Miki Matheson
 Luca Pancalli
 John Petersson
 Majid Rashed
 Robyn Smith

The IPC Athletes' Council Chairperson, Jitske Visser, and IPC Athletes' Council First Vice Chairperson, Josh Dueck, also have voting rights on the board.

IPC Honorary Board 
The IPC has an honorary board of distinguished individuals who support the IPC's goals and use their profile to raise funds and awareness for its work.

Current honorary board members are:
 Princess Margriet of the Netherlands
 Grand Duchess Maria Teresa of Luxembourg
 Crown Princess Victoria of Sweden
 Prince Albert of Monaco
 James Wolfensohn, former President of the World Bank
 Maria Guleghina, opera singer 
 Princess Haya Bint Al Hussein
 Thérèse Rein, Founder of Ingeus
 Princess Astrid of Belgium.

History

Chronology of milestones in the development of the International Paralympic Committee and the Summer and Winter Paralympics.

Publications
The IPC publishes The Paralympian three times a year.

Paralympic SPORT.TV
The Paralympics and other sport events related The Paralympic Movement to be watched on Internet TV channel for Paralympic sports created of IPC.

Paralympic Hall of Fame

 2006: Jouko Grip , Ulla Renvall , Annemie Schneider 
 2008: Connie Hansen , Claudia Hengst , Peter Homann , André Viger , Kevin McIntosh (coach) 
 2010: Tanja Kari , Chris Waddell , Rolf Hettich (coach) 
 2012: Louise Sauvage , Trischa Zorn-Hudson , Roberto Marson , Frank Ponta , Chris Holmes 
 2014: Jon Kreamelmeyer , Eric Villalon Fuentes , Verena Bentele

Paralympic marketing

The Organizing Committees

In June 2001, the International Olympic Committee (IOC) and the International Paralympic Committee (IPC) signed an agreement that would ensure that the staging of the Paralympic Games is automatically included in the bid for the Olympic Games. The agreement came into effect at the 2008 Paralympic Summer Games in Beijing, and the 2010 Paralympic Winter Games in Vancouver.

However, the Salt Lake 2002 Organizing Committee (SLOC), chose to follow the practice of "one bid, one city" already at the 2002 Games in Salt Lake City, with one Organizing Committee for both Games, which was followed up by the 2004 Games in Athens and Beijing in 2008.

The agreement was adjusted in 2003. An extension was signed in June 2006. A further extension was signed in 2012, valid until 2020. In March 2018, a historic long-term extension was signed establishing a partnership until 2032.

National Paralympic Committees (NPCs)

The NPCs receive financial support for the training and development of Paralympic teams, Paralympic athletes and Paralympic hopefuls.

International Paralympic Sports Federations (IFs)

There are 11 international federations recognized by the IPC, and there are four disability specific organizations, while the IPC itself serves as the international federation for 10 sports.

On 30 November 2016, the IPC officially adopted the "World Para" brand for all sports in which it is the international federation. Sports contested in the Summer Paralympics began using the new branding immediately. For winter sports, whose competitive seasons had already started by the announcement, only the world championships were immediately changed to reflect the new branding; the full switchover did not occur until the 2017–18 season.

Note that the Paralympic versions of some sports have different governing structures than the able-bodied versions of the same sports:
 The remit of World Para Nordic Skiing includes both Para biathlon and Para cross-country skiing; the able-bodied versions of the two disciplines are governed by entirely separate international federations, respectively the International Biathlon Union (IBU) and International Ski Federation (FIS).
 Able-bodied Alpine skiing and snowboarding are also governed by FIS. The IPC has distinct governing councils for its versions of the sports.

World Para Alpine Skiing
Supervises and co-ordinates the World Para Alpine Skiing Championships and other competitions.
 Official website: WorldParaAlpineSkiing.org (Paralympic.org/alpine-skiing)
 Sport name: Para alpine skiing
 Former sport committee name: IPC Alpine Skiing

World Para Athletics
Supervises and co-ordinates the World Para Athletics Championships, World Para Athletics European Championships and other competitions.
 Official website: WorldParaAthletics.org (Paralympic.org/athletics)
 Sport name: Para athletics
 Former sport committee name: IPC Athletics

World Para Dance Sport
Supervises and co-ordinates the World Para Dance Sport Championships and other competitions. The rebranding saw the sport renamed from "wheelchair dance sport" to "Para dance sport" due to the IPC's desire to expand the sport beyond wheelchair users.
 Official website: WorldParaDanceSport.org (Paralympic.org/dance-sport)
 Sport name: Para dance sport
 Former sport committee name: IPC Wheelchair Dance Sport

World Para Ice Hockey
Supervises and co-ordinates the World Para Ice Hockey Championships and other competitions. With the November 2016 rebranding, the official name of the sport was changed from "sledge hockey" to "Para ice hockey". This change was made upon the request of the sport's community, partly due to the word "sledge" having different meanings across languages.
 Official website: WorldParaIceHockey.org (Paralympic.org/ice-hockey)
 Sport name: Para ice hockey
 Former sport committee name: IPC Ice Sledge Hockey

World Para Nordic Skiing
Supervises and co-ordinates the World Para Nordic Skiing Championships and other competitions.
 Official website: WorldParaNordicSkiing.org (Paralympic.org/nordic-skiing)
 Sport name: Para Nordic skiing (includes Para biathlon and Para cross-country skiing)
 Former sport committee names: IPC Biathlon & IPC Cross-Country

World Para Powerlifting
Supervises and co-ordinates the World Para Powerlifting Championships and other competitions.
 Official website: WorldParaPowerlifting.org (Paralympic.org/powerlifting)
 Sport name: Para powerlifting
 Former sport committee name: IPC Powerlifting

World Shooting Para Sport
Supervises and co-ordinates the World Shooting Para Sport Championships and other competitions. The rebranding saw the sport renamed as "shooting Para sport" to avoid possible confusion with parachuting.
 Official website: WorldShootingParaSport.org (Paralympic.org/shooting)
 Sport name: Shooting Para sport
 Former sport committee name: IPC Shooting

World Para Snowboard
Supervises and co-ordinates the World Para Snowboard Championships and other competitions.
 Official website: WorldParaSnowboard.org (Paralympic.org/snowboard)
 Sport name: Para snowboard
 Former sport committee name: IPC Snowboard

World Para Swimming
Supervises and co-ordinates the World Para Swimming Championships and other competitions.
 Official website: WorldParaSwimming.org (Paralympic.org/swimming)
 Sport name: Para swimming
 Former sport committee name: IPC Swimming

The Paralympic Partner programme
The Paralympic Partner (TOP) sponsorship programme includes the following commercial sponsors of the Paralympic Games.
 Atos
 Bridgestone
 Ottobock
 Panasonic
 Samsung
 Toyota
 Visa

See also
 Disabled sports

Notes

References

 IPC Style Guide, International Paralympic Committee (IPC)

External links

 
 Paralympic Sport TV YouTube channel

 
Parasports organizations
International organisations based in Bonn
Sports organizations established in 1989
1989 establishments in West Germany